William Basham may refer to:

W. Ralph Basham (born 1943), American government official
William Richard Basham (1804–1877), English physician